On April 16, 2012, Robert Cipriano (November 30, 1959 – April 16, 2012) was murdered by his adopted son, 19-year-old Tucker Robert Cipriano (born April 5, 1993) and Tucker's 20-year-old friend Mitchell Young at the Cipriano family home in Farmington Hills, Michigan.

Tucker and Young also attacked Tucker's mother, Rosemary, and his 17-year-old brother, Salvatore. Tucker Cipriano was sentenced to life in prison without parole on July 24, 2013.

Background

During the last week of March, 2012, Tucker Cipriano and his friend Ian Zinderman met and befriended Mitchell Young in Farmington Hills where the three all lived. Young was employed but living out of his truck. His mother required him to move out of her home due to his not having taken steps to finance enrollment in college. At the time of the murder, he was applying to the MIAT College of Technology, according to Young at his sentencing.

In early April, Cipriano was concerned about being arrested for violating his probation. Cipriano and Young formed the plan to break into a home and rob and kill the occupants. They sought $3,000, of which Cipriano would pay the others their share and then escape to Mexico. Zinderman, however, refused any involvement in murder. Yet on April 15, the day prior to the killing, they were not initially considering that plan. On the evening of April 15, the three sought to buy K2 synthetic marijuana, and chose to break into the Cipriano household as Cipriano knew there were debit cards in the car in the garage. To this end, Young drove the men to the house, and waited in his truck nearby while Zinderman boosted Cipriano as he entered the garage side window. In the car he found a Dearborn Federal Credit Union card. With this, the group went to one of the Valero stations in Farmington Hills and tried without success to withdraw $100 from the ATM. They then used the card successfully to buy a bag of K2 Spice, and Young used the card to fill his gas tank. Subsequently, the three  drove nine miles north to a Mobil Station in Keego Harbor near the residence of Cipriano's girlfriend. At this Mobil, the group tried the Dearborn card again and it did not work. When this occurred, they reflected on their plan of murder and robbery. Cipriano and Young decided to attack the Cipriano household. However, some of this background narrative is based on the testimony of Ian Zinderman. He had forgotten that the three visited a second Mobil station as revealed by surveillance. Young, whose own testimony was heavily criticized, requested without success that Zinderman be impeached as a witness testifying against Young.

During this initial time in Keego Harbor, Cipriano and Young assigned themselves to kill specific members of the Cipriano family. Cipriano was to kill his brothers, while Young was to kill Cipriano's parents; Young also volunteered to kill their eight-year-old daughter, Isabella. But as these roles were being assigned, Cipriano became upset and hesitant at the thought of having his younger sister, Isabella, killed. The group therefore opted to try searching the garage once more for money. They then drove back south to Farmington Hills and the Cipriano house. Once again, Zinderman aided Cipriano in climbing into the garage where he found a gift debit card. On the card was a sticker appearing to read $265. Satisfied with this despite their larger aim, the group drove back north to Keego Harbor in Young's truck. But there they discovered the card held only $2.65. After this disappointment, Cipriano and Young made a final decision to carry out their murder plan against the Cipriano family, having tired of wavering.

Zinderman, however, at that point declined any further participation as he was unwilling to be involved with murder. Due to his abandoning the crime, during the investigation Zinderman was granted immunity for testifying against the other two. Around 1:45 AM on April 16, Cipriano and Young dropped Zinderman off at Cipriano's girlfriend's house in Keego Harbor. Cipriano and Young returned south to Farmington Hills and broke into the Ciprianos' house a third and final time, shortly after 2:30 a.m. on April 16. They brought knives, intending to stab the Cipriano family as they slept.

Attacks

Shortly after 2:30 a.m. on April 16, 2012, Young boosted Cipriano into the Ciprianos' garage, where Cipriano picked up an Easton baseball bat and then opened a door to let Young in. But the family dog, Emmy, hindered them as they made their way through the garage. Emmy barked and woke up the family. Robert Cipriano confronted the intruders in the kitchen, and demanded that they leave, at which point, Cipriano started beating Robert with the Easton bat. Young allegedly objected, "what are you doing?" and Cipriano replied, "join this, or you will join them." He then gave the bat to Young, directing him to kill Robert while Tucker restrained Robert on the floor. During investigation, in fact, it was concluded that Young had inflicted the blows that killed Robert, as the impact spatter of blood on Young's lower trousers indicated that he had been standing directly over Robert as he was beaten to death. Robert Cipriano's wife Rosemary witnessed this attack, during which their youngest child, Isabella, came down the stairs with a Quest bat to give to Rosemary to defend Robert. Young, instead, took the Quest bat and struck Rosemary with it. During the attacks, Cipriano's brother Tanner called 911 while hiding upstairs; yet by the time the police had arrived, Rosemary Cipriano and her son Salvatore had been nearly fatally beaten with the Quest bat. The victims were all members of Tucker's adoptive family: his father, Robert Cipriano; his mother, Rosemary "Rose" Cipriano, and his 17-year-old brother, Salvatore "Sal" Cipriano. Robert died from the attacks, while Rose and Sal were permanently injured. Sal was left mute and permanently brain damaged.

Both Tucker and Young were under the influence of the synthetic drug known as K2 during the attack, a fact that would become a major fixation of the subsequent murder trial.

The audio recording from Tanner Cipriano's several 9-1-1 calls also played a major role in the perpetrators' trials.

Aftermath

Trial
Tucker Cipriano pled nolo contendere (no contest) to first-degree felony murder and was sentenced to life in prison without the possibility of parole. Mitchell Young pled not guilty to five charges, first-degree premeditated murder, first degree felony murder, two counts of assault with intent to murder (Rosemary and Salvatore Cipriano), and armed robbery. Young was convicted on all five counts and was sentenced to life in prison without the possibility of parole.

Appeal 
On October 28, 2015, Mitchell Young's appeal was denied, and all convictions were upheld by the Michigan Supreme Court.

Perpetrators

Tucker Cipriano
Tucker Robert Cipriano (born April 5, 1993) was adopted by Robert and Rosemary Cipriano.

Mitchell Young
Mitchell Young (born: January 16, 1992) was Tucker Cipriano's friend who was present at the crime scene while the murder and assaults occurred. Although he denied his complicity in the attacks, in 2014 his conviction and sentence of life in prison without parole were upheld on all counts. During Young's sentencing, judge Shalina Kumar noted that Young is highly gifted intellectually, and acknowledged that his stepfather had been abusive to him. At sentencing, Young asserted that at the time of the murder he was applying for financial aid to attend the Michigan Institute of Aviation Technology.

At his sentencing, Young spoke on issues intended for his appeal, including his claim of ineffective assistance of counsel. He alleged that his statements during the investigation were inappropriately edited by detective Richard Wehby. Young claimed that witnesses he requested should testify were not called upon to testify. He also stated that he was not allowed to use all four of the defenses that were agreed to apply to his case, abandonment, duress, mere presence, and claim-of-right. Only mere presence and duress were presented. Young also claimed that Ian Zinderman could be impeached as a witness due to Zinderman's inconsistent statements and admission of faulty recollection. These and other arguments were judged as meritless on Young's subsequent appeal.

See also
 List of homicides in Michigan
 Criticism of adoption

References

Crimes in Michigan
Deaths by person in Michigan
Murder in Michigan
2012 murders in the United States
April 2012 crimes in the United States
2012 in Michigan
2013 in Michigan